The following is a list of prominent Afro-Guyanese, or people of Afro-Guyanese descent.

Notable people of Afro-Guyanese descent 

 David Lammy, British-born politician and lawyer
 Deborah Cox, Canadian R&B singer-songwriter with longest-running #1 R&B track on charts
 Jason David, Canadian-born American football cornerback
 JDiggz, Canadian rapper, Afro-Guyanese mother
 Melanie Fiona, Canadian R&B singer-songwriter, who is also of Indo-Guyanese descent
 Nubya Garcia, English saxophonist and jazz musician, Guyanese mother
 Tessa McWatt, Guyanese-born Canadian writer
 Des'ree, English singer, Afro-Guyanese mother
 Sonnet L'Abbé, Canadian writer
 Dawnn Lewis, American actress
 Leona Lewis, singer and the first winner of "The X Factor" (series 3), Guyanese father
 Jermain Jackman, singer and "The Voice UK" (2015) winner
 Derek Luke, American actor
 Maestro, Canadian rapper and actor
 Nicole Narain, Playboy model, has a Afro-Guyanese mother and her father, who is of mixed Indo-Guyanese and Chinese-Guyanese descent
 Trevor Phillips, British politician
 Rihanna, Barbados-born singer/billionaire, Afro-Guyanese mother
 Saukrates, Canadian rapper/singer
 Eon Sinclair, bassist of Canadian rock/ska/reggae band Bedouin Soundclash
 Sean Patrick Thomas, actor (Save the Last Dance and Barbershop)
 Phil Lynott, English-born frontman of the Irish rock band Thin Lizzy, Afro-Guyanese father
 Wretch 32, British rapper, Guyanese mother
 Vanessa Lee Chester, former American child actress ("A Little Princess", "Harriet the Spy", and "The Lost World: Jurassic Park")
 Letitia Wright, actress, who is best-known for playing Shuri in the 2018 film version of "Black Panther" and the 2022 sequel "Black Panther: Wakanda Forever"
 Roy Woods, Canadian R&B artist
 Saint JHN, Guyanese-American rapper
 Shaunette Renée Wilson, Guyanese-born American actress ("The Resident", "Billions", and "Black Panther")

Arts 

 Eddy Grant, musician
 Ram John Holder, actor and musician
 Colle´ Kharis, Reggae recording artist
 Preme, Canadian rapper
 Red Café, Guyanese-American rapper

Sports 

 Terrence Alli, former lightweight and super lightweight contender
 Clifford Anderson, former British Empire featherweight contender
 Basil Butcher, former Guyanese and West Indian cricketer
 Colin Croft, former Guyanese and West Indian cricketer
 Chelsea Edghill, Guyanese table tennis player
 Roy Fredericks, former Guyanese and West Indian cricketer
 Lance Gibbs, former Guyanese and West Indian cricketer
 Vivian Harris, former WBA super lightweight champion
 Roger Harper, former Guyanese and West Indian cricketer
 Carl Hooper, former West Indian cricket captain
 Ezekiel Jackson, professional wrestler
 Clayton Lambert, American, Guyanese and West Indian cricketer, scored the most runs for Guyana
 Andrew Lewis, former WBA welterweight champion
 Clive Lloyd, former Guyanese and West Indian cricketer
 Michael Parris, former bantamweight boxer, Guyana's only Olympic medallist.
 Aliann Pompey, Guyanese 400 meter sprinter
 Alana Shipp - Barbadian IFBB professional bodybuilder
 Hilbert Foster, Cricket and sports administrator. President of Berbice Cricket Board

Politicians and social leaders 

 Forbes Burnham, President of Guyana, 1980-1985
 Hubert Nathaniel Critchlow, father of the trade union movement in British Guiana
 Cuffy, leader of the Berbice slave uprising
 Karen de Souza (born 1958), women and children's activist
 Jack Gladstone, leader of the Demerara rebellion of 1823
 David A. Granger, President of Guyana
 Hamilton Green, 1st Muslim Prime Minister of Guyana, and in the Western world, 1985-1992
 Desmond Hoyte, President of Guyana, 1985-1992
 Sam Hinds, former President of Guyana, Prime Minister of Guyana
 Eusi Kwayana, former Guyanese cabinet member and veteran politician
 Lincoln Lewis, trade union leader
 Quamina, leader of the Demerara rebellion of 1823
 Ptolemy Reid, former Prime Minister of Guyana

Academics 

 John Agard, playwright, poet and children's writer
 George Granville Monah James, historian and author
 Egbert Martin, 19th century Guyanese poet of mixed African and European ancestry
 Walter Rodney, historian and political activist
 Ivan Gladstone Van Sertima, associate professor of Africana Studies at Rutgers University

Models 
 Arti Cameron

 
Lists of people by ethnicity